Darren Eric Henley (July 9, 1959 – October 28, 2022), better known by his stage name D. H. Peligro, was an American punk rock musician, most commonly known as the drummer for The Dead Kennedys along with a brief stint as the drummer for Red Hot Chili Peppers.

Career

The Dead Kennedys (1981–1986, 2001–2008, 2009–2022)
Peligro joined The Dead Kennedys in February 1981, replacing original drummer, Ted, and made his recorded debut with the group on the EP In God We Trust, Inc. which was released in December of that year. He would go on to record the studio albums Plastic Surgery Disasters, Frankenchrist, and Bedtime for Democracy, as well as singles and other tracks that appeared on the collection, Give Me Convenience or Give Me Death. The Dead Kennedys broke up in December 1986.

In 2001, The Dead Kennedys along with Peligro reunited without former frontman and primary songwriter Jello Biafra following a civil fraud complaint against Biafra, accusing him of withholding royalties. Biafra was ultimately convicted of fraud, malice and breach of contract, a verdict upheld on appeal before the California Supreme Court, and was ordered to pay $220,000 in actual and punitive damages.

In early 2008, Peligro took a hiatus from The Dead Kennedys, citing the need for time off from touring. The brief hiatus lasted until June 2009 when Peligro rejoined the band.

Red Hot Chili Peppers (1988)

In 1988, Peligro joined the Red Hot Chili Peppers replacing drummer Jack Irons. Guitarist Hillel Slovak had recently died of a heroin overdose and was replaced by guitarist DeWayne McKnight. Peligro had been friends with the band for years and had played in a comedy band called Three Little Butt Hairs with singer Anthony Kiedis and bassist Flea. McKnight was fired three shows into their tour in September 1988 and was replaced by John Frusciante. Peligro would last a bit longer than McKnight, helping to write some songs on the band's fourth album, Mother's Milk, which was released the following year, although Peligro did not perform on the album. Due to his ongoing drug and alcohol issues, the band decided to fire Peligro in November 1988. Peligro didn't handle his firing well.  Flea said that he stayed in bed for days after making the decision to fire Peligro. Years later, Kiedis said firing Peligro was one of the toughest things the band ever had to do, although Kiedis became a major part of Peligro's road to sobriety, which began after he was fired. Chad Smith replaced Peligro a few weeks later and has been with the band ever since.

Other bands
Peligro also played briefly with The Hellations, Jungle Studs, Nailbomb, The Feederz, Lock-Up, The Two Free Stooges and SSI. Peligro was the frontman for his band called Peligro (Spanish for "Danger") and has released three albums: Peligro (released in 1995 on Biafra's Alternative Tentacles record label, but deleted from the catalog in 2001), Welcome to America and Sum of Our Surroundings, which won Rock Album of the Year from the American Independent Music Awards. Peligro's sound is known to be an eclectic combination of punk, reggae, funk and heavy metal. D. H. Peligro has also fronted the bands Reverend Jones and the Cool Aid Choir and Al Sharpton's Hair and the Hellions. He appears as an interview subject in the 2003 documentary Afro-Punk. In 2020, Peligro recorded the song  "Power is Taken" with Moby, which was also included on Moby’s album All Visible Objects.

Death
On October 28, 2022, Peligro died in his Los Angeles home. Police reported that he died from trauma to the head, caused by an accidental fall.

Discography

Dead Kennedys

 In God We Trust, Inc. (1981)
 Plastic Surgery Disasters (1982)
 Frankenchrist (1985)
 Bedtime for Democracy (1986)
 Give Me Convenience or Give Me Death (1987)
 DMPO's on Broadway (2000)
 Mutiny on the Bay (2001)
 The Early Years Live (2001)
 In God We Trust, Inc.: The Lost Tapes (2003)
 Live at the Deaf Club (2004)
 Milking the Sacred Cow (2007)
 Original Singles Collection (2014)

Jungle Studs
 Jungle Studs (1986)

Peligro
 Peligro (1995)
 Welcome To America (2000)
 Sum Of Our Surroundings (2004)

Red Hot Chili Peppers
 Mother's Milk (1989) (co-wrote "Sexy Mexican Maid", "Stone Cold Bush" and "Taste the Pain")

Nailbomb
 Proud to Commit Commercial Suicide (1995) (drums on "Police Truck (The Dead Kennedys Cover)", "Exploitation (Doom Cover)" and "World of Shit")

References

External links
 
 

1959 births
2022 deaths
Dead Kennedys members
Red Hot Chili Peppers members
American punk rock drummers
American male drummers
Musicians from St. Louis
African-American drummers
African-American rock musicians
Alternative Tentacles artists
20th-century American drummers
Lock Up (American band) members
Nailbomb members
Accidental deaths in California
Accidental deaths from falls